"Don't Ask My Name" is a famous North Korean song. The music was composed by Ri Jeong-sul and the lyrics were written by Hwang Sin Yong.  It was released in 1990 by the Pochonbo Electronic Ensemble.  Since then, various versions of the song have been played by other musical groups based in North Korea, including the Wangjaesan Light Music Band.  The song is quite popular and is frequently played on North Korean radio stations and television shows. The song is typically sung by a woman and urges the listener not to be concerned with her own name, but instead to remember the name of the Workers' Party of Korea and all the workers who are striving to build a prosperous nation.

External links

YouTube: "Don't Ask My Name", performed by Ri Kyong Suk of the Pochonbo Electronic Ensemble
The audio version, which was uploaded to Soundcloud in 2013

1990 singles
North Korean songs
1990 songs